Year 323 (CCCXXIII) was a common year starting on Tuesday (link will display the full calendar) of the Julian calendar. At the time, it was known as the Year of the Consulship of Severus and Rufinus (or, less frequently, year 1076 Ab urbe condita). The denomination 323 for this year has been used since the early medieval period, when the Anno Domini calendar era became the prevalent method in Europe for naming years.

Events 
 By place 
 Roman Empire 
 Emperor Constantine the Great defeats the invading Goths and Sarmatians north of the Danube in Dacia, and claims the title of Sarmaticus Maximus.

 China 
 Crown Prince Ming of Jin succeeds his father Yuan of Jin as emperor of the Eastern Jin Dynasty.

By topic

Religion 
 The poetic work Banquet (Thalia) by the Libyan-born Egyptian Christian priest Arius, age 73, expresses the doctrine that Jesus of Nazareth was not of the same substance as God but rather had a finite nature. As an ascetic, he leads a Christian community near Alexandria, and comes under suspicion of heresy. Arius writes to his former schoolmate Eusebius, bishop of Nicomedia, asking for support. Eusebius writes to other bishops, and when Arius is condemned in September, Eusebius gives him safe haven, and sponsors a synod at Bithynia in October, which nullifies Arius's excommunication (see Council of Nicaea).

Births 
 Constans I, Roman consul and emperor (d. 350)

Deaths 
 January 3 – Yuan of Jin (or Jingwen), Chinese emperor (b. 276)
 Tiberius Julius Rhadamsades, Roman prince and client king
 Zhang Bin (or Mengsun), Chinese general and strategist

References